The roles of women in Lebanon have evolved throughout history. Lebanon is known for its active feminist movements in the Arab region. Oftentimes they aim to overcome legal and sociopolitical discriminations enshrined in personal status law. In the 17 October Revolution, especially women called for reforming the sectarian system in Lebanon, in order to acquire equal rights regarding citizenship, inheritance and protection against domestic violence.

History 
Lebanese women obtained women's suffrage on February 8, 1953. Since that time, Lebanese women showed great progress towards sustainable empowerment goals. In 1997, Lebanon acceded to the Convention on the Elimination of All Forms of Discrimination Against Women (CEDAW). In 1998, Lebanon established the National Commission for Lebanese Women (NCLW).

According to Human Rights Watch, Lebanese authorities fail to meet their legal obligations towards protecting women from violence and ending discrimination against them. Trans women, female sex workers, refugees, and asylum seekers have endured systemic violence, including rape, in Lebanese detention centers. Female migrant workers under the Kafala system, with no labor laws to protect them, have faced employer abuse and negligence especially after the spread of COVID-19, the economic crisis starting in August 2019, and the August 2020 Beirut port explosion.

During a session with the UN Human Rights Council on January 18, 2021, Lebanon's Universal Periodical Review (UPR) submitted recommendations designed to enhance human rights measures and protections in Lebanon. The government of Lebanon, according to Amnesty International, should yield to international pressures to address core issues regarding women's civil, social, and economic rights, especially since only minor improvements were made since its last review in 2015. Recommendations made by 47 governments at the UPR Working Group session included the end of torture via authority figures and their impunity, decriminalization of defamation, elimination of the Kafala system, and enhancement of citizens’ rights to protest, assemble, and have freedom of speech.

Gender roles
Article 7 of the constitution of Lebanon asserts that all citizens should have equal rights and duties regardless of gender. Article 8 states that individual liberty will be guaranteed and protected by law.

Marriage

Lebanese penal code 
The penal code in Lebanon, and specifically concerning marriage, used to be in favor of the man. However, it has witnessed some reforms. Article 562, which had historically been used to reduce sentences awarded for a non-premeditated honor killing resulting from an "illegitimate" sexual intercourse, was scrapped by the Lebanese Parliament on August 4, 2011. Moreover, in 2014, the Lebanese Parliament finally passed a full-fledged law targeting domestic violence. Nevertheless, some existing laws still tend to favor men in some aspects. For example, if the male spouse is an adulterer, before being accused, his adulterous act is questioned on whether it was done in the marital home or in public. However, if a woman is accused of adulterous acts, she is automatically convicted. Moreover, if convicted, the sentencing time is less for a male than female (male: one month to one year, female: three months to three years). Recently, there have been talks about decriminalizing adultery altogether, and a draft law submitted by MP Samy Gemayel on the matter is still pending review. Moreover, in Lebanon under article 503 raped is defined as "forced sexual intercourse who is not his wife by violence or threat", through this definition, rape is not recognized in a marital relationship. However, through the 2014 law on domestic violence, there were claims of "marital rights to intercourse" would have penalties including fines but no mention of criminalization.

Draft law for descendants of Lebanese women 
Under the current Lebanese nationality law, descendants of Lebanese emigrants can only receive citizenship from their father; women cannot pass on citizenship to their spouses or children.

On November 7, 2015, Gebran Bassil, the Minister of Foreign Affairs and Emigrants then, "refused to compromise on a draft law that would grant citizenship to the descendants of Lebanese expatriates by expanding it to include the foreign spouses and children of Lebanese women".

Single mothers 
A large proportion of Lebanese society is still against premarital sex or single mothers, and there have been many cases where Lebanese women were blacklisted by their families for them being pregnant before marriage. Some people have even reached the extent to kill their sister or daughter for having alleged pre-marital sexual relationships, calling it an "honor crime".

In Lebanon, the first reach in this situation is usually for the parents to make the man marry their daughter. The second attempt is to convince the women to have an abortion.

Hospital practices in maternity wards 
Eight out of 39 hospitals in Lebanon had well established prenatal care classes, however only three actually enrolled all women in these classes. There were other forms of providing, such as information at a low, only having four hospitals giving written information regarding care during the labor as well as delivery. Six healthcare providers reported that inquiring women about their preferences. Furthermore, few gave women any opportunity for procedures such as shaving, enema or fetal monitoring application. Lastly, it was seen that all places had strict mobility for women in the delivery process, including eight who tied their arms and legs.

Children
Parenting was an important political act for some Lebanese in the aftermath of the First World War. This resulted in the reflection of critical transformations in French-Lebanese relations, but also contributed significantly to the process of the state formation. Literature situating children in any historical context in Lebanon is also liable to frame childhood in highly static terms and to underestimate its significance in a matrix of other social, cultural, political, and economic forces. Those identified as such were variously understood as infants, children, youth, adolescents, boys, or girls, mostly on account of the social and gender roles they played, rather than any other set of factors, but also sometimes by age, biology, and even class. One of the most conflicted domains, however, in which definitions of the child were called into question was the law. Also, for Islamic jurists, the age at which a woman received her first menses was important for several reasons. Not only did it signal her entry into adulthood biologically, but it also meant that her responsibilities as a Muslim increased significantly.

Religious and legal status 
In Lebanon personal matters, such as marriage and inheritance, are subject to 15 different personal status laws. These legal statuses had been established along sectarian lines in the French mandate system including Shi'a, Sunni, Maronite Christians, and Druze parties, all of which nowadays "compete to preserve narrow sectarian interests, not those of a unified Lebanon".

Due to the large number of officially recognized religions in Lebanon, Lebanese family matters are governed by at least 15 personal status laws. Hence, Lebanese women have legal protection that varies depending on their religion. In Muslim families, marriageable age can be as soon as the child reaches puberty and polygamy is allowed. Muslim women can legally marry Christian or Jewish men. For example, a Lebanese Catholic man may marry a Muslim woman on the condition of getting their children baptized. Otherwise, the couple may opt for civil marriage performed abroad, which can be registered at any Lebanese Embassy, thus giving it official recognition. This, in fact, is a particularly popular option, with Cyprus usually acting as the destination of choice.

Even though the Lebanese constitution includes "equality in rights and obligations between all citizens without distinction or preference", many laws still contain provisions that discriminate against women. This is due to Lebanese personal status laws, through which Lebanese women's citizenship are subject to their husband's and father's personal status. This personal status depends on men's legal sectarian affiliation. For example, Lebanese women can't pass on their Lebanese nationality to their non-Lebanese husband or their children.

Politics

Women's suffrage 

France confirmed the electoral system of the former Ottoman Mount Lebanon province in setting up a Representative Council for Greater Lebanon in 1922. Two stage elections, universal adult male suffrage, and multimember multi-communal constituencies continued the situation that prevailed in Mount Lebanon up to 1914. Women in Lebanon gained suffrage in 1952, only five years after men did in the new Republic (in the year 1947). The Lebanese constitution — specifically Article 7 — proclaimed that "All Lebanese are equal under the law, enjoying equally civil and political rights, and performing duties and public responsibility without any discrimination among them." This however did not protect against gender discrimination and thus women were not equally protected. Women were refused the right to vote by earlier Lebanese governments, and they were not granted voting rights until they began organizing petitions demanding for equal rights between genders. In 1952, the Women's Political Rights Agreement was signed, and it gave Lebanese women who had at least finished elementary education the right to vote. The limitation requiring women to at least have an elementary education to vote was lifted five years later in 1957 without much discourse.

Political representation 

Women gained the right to vote halfway into the 20th century, thirty years after American women suffragists gained the right in the United States. Though the women of Lebanon garnered their right to vote fairly early on, there is still a huge lack of them in Lebanon's political sphere. The political field in Lebanon, like most of the rest of the world, is male dominated.

As of 2009, there had only been 17 women to serve on parliament since suffrage. That number is rather dismal, but it paints the perfect picture of what the outlook of women in parliament is. The lack of women in politics is chalked up the political exclusivity that is bred in Lebanon, constricting societal norms and gender roles. The political arena in the country is mostly made of a small number of elite families that have been in power since the 1950s,1960s, and the beginning of suffrage. There is an extreme lack of women in elected and appointed political positions. To combat the low rate of women's participation in politics and government, the Lebanese Women's Council (LWC) planned a conference in 1998. Along with other women's NGOs, the LWC proposed a quota system to the government to ensure women's equal representation in elections.

The Lebanese constitution is a French system, which promotes equality between “all” citizens. However, in Lebanon the governmental power of the country is separated by the religious factions based on the size of each of their populations. These figures are extremely outdated and are based on a census of the country that was taken in the year 1943.

As of 2009 according to Don Duncan of Le Monde Diplomatique (English edition), “With only 3.1% of seats now occupied by women, Lebanon is at the bottom of the table of parliamentary representation of women in the Middle East, down with conservative Gulf states like: Oman (none), Yemen (0.3%) and Bahrain (2.7%) (2), whereas neighboring Syria has 12.4%, Tunisia has 22.8% and Iraq has a 25% quota for women".

Education 
Education was on the colonial agenda from beginning to end and was awarded special attention on account of its perceived ability to effect the greatest change in the greatest number of Lebanese. It was also something that missionaries and colonial administrators believed they could collaborate on together, as they imagined a similar citizen-figure into which Lebanese children were to be crafted by the West. Young people were marked out by foreign missionaries for their potential to transform not just the next generation of Lebanese but also the present generation of parents, especially mothers.

Efforts to provide women with education in Lebanon appeared in the 1860s. In 1860, the idea of having a school for girls started to manifest after the civil war in Mount Lebanon. Following the war, the need for women to work was recognized to rebuild the struggling post-war economy. During the period 1860 to 1869, the number of schools for girls significantly increased from 4 to 23 schools. Similarly, after World War I, the need to educate women was further emphasized and a new idea toward women roles was established. Women started to be offered jobs as nurses, technicians, teachers, and office assistance. Accordingly, more women were encouraged to get educated. Moreover, during the first half of the 20th-century colleges started to accept women students. The American Junior College for Women was founded in 1924 being the first college in Lebanon built only for women. At the time only two other colleges admitted women which are the American University of Beirut and Universite St. Joseph.

Economic life 
The Lebanese Civil War and the Israeli Invasion of Lebanon have affected Lebanon's economy tremendously. Since 2008 their economy has grown about 8 percent but not significantly enough as they are still a country highly in debt from war. Women in correlation with the economy have been able to participate since the 1970s but they are still underrepresented in the labor force and are the first to be negatively impacted when the economy fails. Currently in Lebanon, Article 215 of their Law of Contracts and Obligations allow men and women the same right to own and administer property. Married women can even own and manage their property separately regardless of their religious affiliation.

Workforce 
According to a report by the International Foundation for Electoral Systems (IFES) and the Institute for Women's Policy Research (IWPR), most women in Lebanon under the age of 25 aspired to at least attend college or university (75% of respondents). The top fields of study for women under 25 were reported to be business administration (15%), hard sciences (11%) and art and design (10%). Despite the majority of women stating their intention to work in the future, only 37% of women actually work (compared to 78% of men). The most common reason, by far (58%), for not working is the women's duties as a housewife.

Feminism and activism 
Women who are engaged in political organizations often acquire social stigma. For example, many women within the Palestinian resistance movement live in Lebanese camps. These women "have political meetings at night and often sleep away from home. Many have been called prostitutes for doing so. But they have stood fast saying that their country comes before family".

Local and regional NGOs have helped to increase awareness of violence against women in Lebanon. However, government policies regarding this are poor, and attempts to implement new laws that would protect women against violence have been met with resistance. Lebanon's laws do not recognize the concept of spousal rape, and attempts to add this to law have been attacked by Lebanese clerics. There are between eight and eleven rapes and murders of spouses reported in the media every year.

In 2010, a draft version of the Law to Protect Women from Family Violence was proposed, to stop domestic violence against women, including marital rape. Over time, while it was stuck at Parliament, this law was amended continuously due to objections of religious conservatives. Suggestions to amend the law included removal of the segment outlining marital rape as a crime.

In December 2020, the Lebanese parliament passed a law criminalizing sexual harassment, in which the perpetrators might spend up to four years in prison.

Organizations 
Founded in 1947, the League for Lebanese Women's Rights (LLWR) is a feminine, non-profit democratic and secular organization that works with volunteers in several branches dispersed within Lebanon. The organization seeks to implement the Convention on the Elimination of All Forms of Discrimination against Women (CEDAW) in Lebanon. One convention, as part of CEDAW, seeks to amend Lebanese nationality laws that prevent women from passing their citizenship to their children.

Another organization is "The A Project", a feminist sexual health organization founded in 2014. The organization provides a sexuality hotline, solidarity groups, outreach and training, and conducts research into sexuality issues in Lebanon. In 2016, they received a 20,000 euro grant from Mama Cash, a feminist grant-giving organization that supports services for women, girls, trans and non-binary people, and intersex people.

During the COVID-19 pandemic, there have been several female-led initiatives. Lebanon Family Planning Association for Development and Family Empowerment (LFPADE) has provided life-saving services, including pediatric services, and maintained women and girls’ Sexual and Reproductive Health and Rights (SRHR) by keeping its medical centers open and providing these services to marginalized communities —including refugees. The Palestinian Women's Humanitarian Organization (PWHO) is a non-profit organization founded in 1988 that supports Syrian and Palestinian female refugees and children living in camps in Lebanon. PWHO has shared COVID-19 related health information such as symptoms, prevention, and treatment with refugees living in camps in Lebanon via WhatsApp and Facebook. Members from the organization are going door-to-door to provide hard-to-reach displaced persons with health kits, information, and health checkups.

People 
Emily Nasrallah was a Lebanese author and women's rights activist. She was granted the National Order of the Cedar by President of the Republic of Lebanon General Michel Aoun in recognition of her literary contributions one month before her death. She documented the women's rights movement during the Lebanese civil war.

Rankings 
According to the World Economic Forum's 2021 Global Gender Gap Report, in terms of gender equality, Lebanese women (with higher numbers being better) in the Middle East region were behind Israel (.724), Egypt (.639), and tied with Jordan (.638), and ranked 132nd out of 156 countries in the report.

Regarding the GGGR subindex, Lebanon ranked 112 of 156 on political empowerment, 82 of 156 on health and survival, 139 of 156 on economic opportunity, and 113 of 156 on educational attainment.

See also
Women in Islam
Women in Arab societies

References

External links

 
Lebanon